Tour de Ijen is a men's cycle race which takes place in Indonesia. Initiated as a stage race in 2012, the Tour de Ijen is rated by the UCI as a 2.2 race, and forms part of the UCI Asia Tour.

Overall winners

References

Cycle races in Indonesia
UCI Asia Tour races
Recurring sporting events established in 2012
2012 establishments in Indonesia